Diablo is a 2015 Canadian-American revisionist Western psychological thriller film produced, co-written and directed by Lawrence Roeck, and starring Scott Eastwood, Walton Goggins, Camilla Belle and Danny Glover. It was the first western film starring Scott Eastwood, the son of Western icon Clint Eastwood.

It was released on January 8, 2016 by Orion Pictures and Momentum Pictures.

Synopsis

In 1872, a young Civil War veteran loses his home to a fire and is forced on a desperate journey to save his kidnapped wife. Jackson, a former member of Union General Sherman's army, embarks on an odyssey of both rescue and revenge. At nearly every turn he encounters a mysterious figure named Ezra who delights in tormenting him, while gleefully murdering any witnesses to their encounters.

But things are not at all what they seem. It develops that Jackson committed countless atrocities under Sherman's command and may have actually experienced some sort of psychotic break in the process. What Jackson perceives and believes may be completely disconnected from the reality of what is actually happening around him.

Cast
 Scott Eastwood as Jackson
 Walton Goggins as Ezra
 Camilla Belle as Alexsandra
 José Zúñiga as Guillermo
 Danny Glover as Benjamin Carver
 Nesta Cooper as Rebecca Carver
 Adam Beach as Nakoma
 Samuel Marty as Ishani
 Joaquim de Almeida as Arturo
 Tzi Ma as Quok Mi
 Rohan Campbell as Robert

Release
The film was released at the San Diego film festival on October 2, 2015.

Critical reception
The film was panned by critics. On Rotten Tomatoes, the film has a "Rotten" 19% rating, based on 21 reviews, with an average rating of 3.47/10. On Metacritic, the film has a score of 35 out of 100, based on 9 reviews, indicating "generally unfavorable reviews".

The AV Club calls it "[t]edious despite its brief running time." Odie Henderson at RogerEbert.com writes that the film ”goes for shock value with its twists, but plays its hand far too early. Our knowledge of events and of character force us to question why the people in the climactic scenes act as stupid as they do."  And Variety says: "The twist...isn’t without promise.... Yet it’s nonetheless clumsily handled, and the last stretch of the film goes south in a hurry."

Accolades 
Diablo won the Best Narrative Feature award at the San Diego International Film Festival in 2015.

References

External links
 
 

2015 films
2015 psychological thriller films
2015 Western (genre) films
American Western (genre) films
Films set in 1872
American psychological thriller films
2010s English-language films
2010s American films